Zieria furfuracea is a plant in the citrus family Rutaceae and is endemic to eastern Australia. It is a shrub with three-part leaves and groups of large numbers of small white flowers, the groups shorter than the leaves. It grows on the coast and tablelands north from Wyong.

Description
Both sides of the leaflets are more or less flat and covered with small, star-like leaves. The upper surface is smooth and a darker green than the lower one. The flowers are white and arranged in large groups, the groups shorter than the leaves. Flowering occurs in spring and summer and is followed by fruits which are smooth follicles covered with soft hairs.

Taxonomy and naming
Zieria furfuracea was first formally described in 1863 by George Bentham from an unpublished description by Robert Brown. Bentham's description was published in Flora Australiensis. The specific epithet (furfuracea) is derived from the Latin word furfur meaning "bran", "scurf", "scale", or "dandruff".

Three subspecies have been described:
Zieria furfuracea subsp. furfuracea;
Zieria furfuracea subsp. euthadenia;
Zieria furfuracea subsp. gymnocarpa.

Distribution and habitat
This zieria occurs in Queensland, New South Wales north of Wyong, growing in forest and rainforest, sometimes on exposed rocky escarpments.

References

External links
 

furfuracea
Sapindales of Australia
Flora of New South Wales
Flora of Queensland
Plants described in 1863